Pat Sin Leng Country Park is a country park in Hong Kong located in the northeastern New Territories. It comprises the Pat Sin Leng mountain range and other spurs, including Wong Leng, Ping Fung Shan, Cloudy Hill and Kwai Tau Leng. Hok Tau Reservoir and Lau Shui Heung Reservoir are also within the country park.

Ecology
The catchment forests are habitats for avian species such as crested bulbul, Chinese bulbul, hwamei, Oriental magpie robin, Chinese francolin, Japanese quail, common kingfisher, European magpie, crested myna and crows. Also dwelling in woodlands are mammals like Malayan porcupine, Chinese pangolin, masked palm civet, leopard cat and common muntjac.

Lau Shui Heung Reservoir is rimmed by Peking willow and Fortune's keteleeria.

Spots
Stages nine and ten (ending stages) of the  Wilson Trail traverse the Pat Sin Leng Country Park. The  section within the park leads from Cloudy Hill to Nam Chung, travelling along the ridges of Wong Leng, Lai Pek Shan and Pat Sin Leng. The view at the top on fine days covers the Plover Cove Reservoir and the urban area of Shenzhen. Other hiking options are the Hok Tau Country Trail and Lau Shui Heung Country Trail.

Sha Lo Tung is an important habitat for dragonflies and damselflies. Ting Kok, a piece of wetland, has been declared a Site of Special Scientific Interest. Yim Tso Ha is one of the largest egretries in Hong Kong.

External links and references

 AFCD Pat Sin Leng
 Initial text based on information provided by the Hong Kong Agriculture, Fisheries and Conservation Department (AFCD), under the provision that the re-dissemination or reproduction is for non-commercial use. 

Country parks and special areas of Hong Kong
North District, Hong Kong
Tai Po District
1978 establishments in Hong Kong